Hayward is a given name. Notable people with the name include:

Hayward Alker (1937–2007), American professor of international relations
Hayward Davenport (1874–1959), British maritime painter
Hayward A. Harvey (1824–1893), American inventor and industrialist
Hayward Mack (1879–1921), American silent film actor
Hayward Morse, British stage and voice actor
Hayward Sanford (1916–2000), American football player
Hayward Williams, American singer-songwriter
Hayward Clay, former American football tight end

See also
 Hayward (disambiguation)